Abhinav Bastakoti (born December 20, 1999), known by his stage name Curtis Waters, is a Canadian-American musician and songwriter. He is known for his self-produced 2020 debut single "Stunnin'". He is the first Nepal-born musician to attain international success.

Early life 
Abhinav Bastakoti was born on December 20, 1999 in Kathmandu, Nepal. At a young age he moved to India, before moving to Germany at the age of 4, then Calgary, Canada at the age of 10 At the age of 14 Bastakoti returned to Nepal for three months to receive his Bratabanda, a complex Hindu coming of age ceremony. Around this time he downloaded FL Studio onto his Laptop and started making beats.  Posting them online in 2017 as Frank Waters, before changing it to Curtis Waters a homage to his two favourite artists Joy Divisions’s Ian Curtis and Frank Ocean. As a teenager attending Sir Winston Churchill High School he struggled with depression and used music and graphic design to overcome it. he would often skip school to compete in beat battles. At the age of 17 he moved to Cary, North Carolina which was a result of his parents educational pursuits. In 2018 He attended the University of North Carolina at Greensboro while working at Tropical Smoothie Cafe.

Career 
In April 2020, Waters posted a 15-second snippet of his hip hop/pop song, "Stunnin'" which became a "viral TikTok sensation." In one month, "Stunnin'" was viewed more than two million times on YouTube. In June, "Stunnin'" was ranked  #3 on Rolling Stone's Breakthrough 25 Chart. By July 2020, "Stunnin'" had been streamed over 35 million times on Spotify.

Waters was chased by numerous labels. He decided to stay independent, but did sign a licensing deal with BMG. His manager is A&R executive Chris Anokute, who helped launch Katy Perry and Rihanna.

In June 2020, Rolling Stone magazine ran an article about Waters. In July 2020, "Stunnin'" was used in a Mercedes-Benz commercial.

Water's second single was "System." He recorded his album Pity Party in his dorm at UNC Greensboro. After production, Pity Party was re-released in October 2020. One reviewer of Pity Party noted, "The throughline in these 12 disparate tracks remains Waters’ distinct point of view, simultaneously self-deprecating, sincere, and disarmingly honest."

Artistry 
His musical influences include Frank Ocean, Kanye West, Odd Future, Tyler the Creator, and Joy Division’s Ian Curtis

Personal life 
Bastakoti lives in Los Angeles, California. He has been open about his experience with depression and bipolar disorder and has expressed his desire to be a mental health advocate in Nepal

Discography

Studio albums

Singles

Featured singles
 2019: "Food Court Heart Break" (33 Life featuring Curtis Waters and Yung Star Ballout)
 2020: "Quarantine Party" (Jay2thekim featuring Curtis Waters)
 2020: "Sensual Healing" (Susanne Davis featuring Asher Porter and Curtis Waters)
 2021: "SugarCrash!" (ElyOtto featuring Kim Petras and Curtis Waters)

References 

1999 births
Living people
Canadian people of Nepalese descent
American people of Nepalese descent
Canadian emigrants to the United States
Nepalese emigrants to Canada
People from Cary, North Carolina
Musicians from Kathmandu
People with bipolar disorder
University of North Carolina at Greensboro alumni
21st-century Canadian male singers
Bertelsmann Music Group artists